Robert Flood Goldsworthy (September 26, 1917 – January 25, 2014) was a state legislator in the U.S. state of Washington. He was born in Spokane. He is also a retired major general in the United States Air Force. He served 9th district in the Washington House of Representatives from 1957 to 1973 as a Republican.

Goldsworthy served in the United States Air Force during World War II and the Korean War, and was kept as a prisoner of war in Japan during the former. He retired from the Air Force in 1975. He died at the age of 96 in January 2014. His wife, Jean died less than a year later, on January 15, 2015. They survived by her son Robert, her daughter Jill, their six grandchildren and eight great-grandchildren.

References

1917 births
2014 deaths
Republican Party members of the Washington House of Representatives
Washington State University alumni
Military personnel from Spokane, Washington
Politicians from Spokane, Washington
United States Army Air Forces personnel of World War II
American prisoners of war in World War II
World War II prisoners of war held by Japan
Shot-down aviators
United States Air Force personnel of the Korean War
United States Army Air Forces bomber pilots of World War II
Recipients of the Legion of Merit
Recipients of the Air Medal